Coloniality of gender is a concept which was created by philosopher Maria Lugones in order to explain the role which European colonialism played in the imposition of European modern/colonial gender structures onto the Indigenous peoples of the Americas. The concept challenges the idea that gender can be separated from colonialism. It builds off of Anibal Quijano's foundational concept of the coloniality of power. It has been applied beyond the Americas, though it originated in this context. It is used in the scholarly fields of decolonial feminism and decoloniality more broadly.

Gender effects 
The coloniality of gender addresses the effects of colonialism on both women and men. In a joint essay, María Lugones, Yuderkys Espinosa-Miñoso, and Nelson Maldonado-Torres argue that the coloniality of gender was about destroying Indigenous people's relation to one another and to the land, stating that the basic idea of European colonialism was "that the earth should be raped for the benefit of man." Rosalba Icaza states that "Lugones helps us to understand the historical moment in which this specific system (sex/gender) became a form of subjugation [for colonized peoples]."

Women 
For Indigenous women, European gender impositions may have normalized the idea that women's subordination was an essential part of being civilized like Europeans. Egla Salazar argues that this may have had the result of normalizing femicide against Indigenous women, such as in the Mayan genocide. 

Lugones, Espinosa-Miñoso, and Maldonado-Torres argue that it normalized the hatred of non-white women and violence directed toward them. They argue that the idea of "woman" was not extended to African and Indigenous women in the same way that it was to white women, because they did not embody the European idea of what it meant be feminine. They argue that white feminists will often ignore or deny this to be the case.

Chiara Bottici states that "a number of Native American tribes adopted matrilineal inheritance and matrilocal culture as their norm rather than the exception," but that the point is not to romanticize the past, but reflect on the ways in which the modern/colonial gender system is not universal. Other societies had a "low intensity patriarchy" that was intensified significantly by European colonialism.

Shannon Frediani argues that "many Indigenous cultures prior to colonialism had forms of governance recognizing women's participation, their knowledges, and centrality in some spiritual orientations" that was ended with the coloniality of gender.

Men 
For non-Western men, the imposition of European gender norms may have shifted the ideal of manliness into being a white European landowner. Egla Salazar argues that the residual effects of this history may still be felt in communities today with men conforming to European ideas of what it means to be a man.

Gender variance 
The concept has also been used to understand the erasure and violence against people who came to be referred to as third gender by Western anthropologists in the Americas through European colonialism.

Alexander I. Stingl states that the concept challenges the lens of LGBTQ identities, and argues that people should look to variance more broadly: "[we should speak to the] variability in subjectivities of gender, sexuality, and sexual practices [rather than to specific identities]."

References 

Decolonial feminism
Critical theory
Decolonization